Mallomonas hexareticulata is a species of heterokont algae. It is a tiny free-living cell, about the width of a human hair. It has ornate scales and bristles, as well as long spines. It is a relatively common part of lake or pond plankton. It differs from its cogenerates by the number, distribution, and size of its base plate pores, the secondary structures on the scale surfaces, together with characteristics of its bristles.

References

Further reading 
 Wei, Yin‐Xin, Xiu‐Ping Yuan, and Jørgen Kristiansen. "Silica‐scaled chrysophytes from Hainan, Guangdong Provinces and Hong Kong Special Administrative Region, China." Nordic Journal of Botany 32.6 (2014): 881-896.
 Gusev, E. S. "A New Species in Genus Mallomonas Perty (Synurales, Chrysophyceae) from Vietnam." International Journal on Algae 17.4 (2015).

External links 
 AlgaeBase
 

Ochrophyta
Protists described in 2013